The World Horror Convention Grand Master Award is a yearly distinction given to an author who has contributed greatly to the field of horror literature.  Nominees must be alive at the time of voting and can not have previously won the award. The award is given at the annual World Horror Convention.

Past recipients
Recipients of the award include:
 Robert Bloch – 1991
 Stephen King – 1992
 Richard Matheson – 1993
 Anne Rice – 1994
 Clive Barker – 1995
 Dean Koontz – 1996
 Peter Straub – 1997
 Brian Lumley – 1998
 Ramsey Campbell – 1999
 Harlan Ellison – 2000
 Ray Bradbury – 2001
 Charles L. Grant – 2002
 Chelsea Quinn Yarbro – 2003
 Jack Williamson – 2004
 F. Paul Wilson – 2005
 Ray Garton – 2006
 Joe R. Lansdale – 2007
 Robert McCammon – 2008
 Tanith Lee – 2009
 James Herbert – 2010
 Jack Ketchum – 2011
 T. E. D. Klein – 2012
 Dan Simmons – 2013
 Brian Keene – 2014
 William F. Nolan – 2015
 Michael R. Collings – 2016

References

Horror fiction awards